Xiaoba is a town under the administration of Beichuan Qiang Autonomous County, Sichuan, China. , it has one residential community and 26 villages under its administration.

References 

Township-level divisions of Sichuan
Beichuan Qiang Autonomous County